is a railway station on the Hōhi Main Line operated by JR Kyushu in Taketa, Ōita Prefecture, Japan.

Lines

Layout 
The station consists of an island platform serving two tracks on a side hill cutting. The station building is a wooden  structure of traditional Japanese design located at a lower level. It houses a waiting room and a JR Kyushu staffed ticket window equipped with a Midori no Madoguchi facility. Access to the platform is by means of an underpass which leads beneath and up to the platform. Several sidings run to the north of the platform.

Adjacent stations

History
The track was extended westwards in phases, with this station opening as the new western terminus on 15 October 1924 with the name Bungo-Takeda (same Kanji characters but with a different reading). On 2 December 1928, the entire track from Kumamoto through this station to Ōita was designated as the Hōhi Main Line. On 1 October 1969, the reading of the station name was changed to Bungo-Taketa, with no change to the Kanji characters. With the privatization of Japanese National Railways (JNR), the successor of JGR, on 1 April 1987, the station came under the control of JR Kyushu.

On 17 September 2017, Typhoon Talim (Typhoon 18) damaged the Hōhi Main Line at several locations. Services between Aso and Nakahanda, including Bungo-Taketa, were suspended and replaced by bus services. Rail service from Aso through this station to Miemachi was restored by 22 September 2017 Normal rail services between Aso and Ōita were restored by 2 October 2017.

Passenger statistics
In fiscal 2016, the station was used by an average of 375 passengers daily (boarding passengers only), and it ranked 277th among the busiest stations of JR Kyushu.

See also
List of railway stations in Japan

References

External links
Bungo-Taketa (JR Kyushu)

Railway stations in Ōita Prefecture
Railway stations in Japan opened in 1924